Jesse William Sweetser (April 18, 1902 – May 27, 1989) was an amateur golfer, best known as the first American-born player to win the British Amateur.

Early life
Born in St. Louis, Missouri, Sweetser later attended Phillips Exeter Academy and Yale University.  In 1920, Sweetser won the individual title at the NCAA Division I Men's Golf Championships. He received golf lessons from noted Siwanoy Country Club professional Tom Kerrigan.

Golf career
Sweetser won the 1922 U.S. Amateur at the age of 20, defeating Bobby Jones, 8 and 7, in the semi-final and then Chick Evans, 3 and 2, in the final match. The following year, he again made the finals but lost on the second playoff hole to Max Marston.

In 1926, Sweetser won the British Amateur at Muirfield, defeating Fred Simpson, 6 and 5, in the final match. The 1904 winner, Walter Travis, was a naturalized American citizen born in Australia, but Sweetser's victory was the first time an American-born golfer had won the tournament.

Sweetster won the Metropolitan Amateur in 1922 and 1925.

Walker Cup
Sweetser was a member of the original Walker Cup team in 1922, and also played in 1923, 1924, 1926, 1928, and 1932. He was also selected for the 1930 team but withdrew for business reasons. Later, he was non-playing captain for the 1967 and 1973 teams. He was also captain for the 1966 U.S. Eisenhower Trophy team.

Professional life
In his professional life, Sweetser started as a stockbroker in the 1920s, and later went to work for Curtiss-Wright.  He retired in 1967 as a vice-president with Martin Marietta.

Sweetser also served as treasurer and on the executive committee of the United States Golf Association.  In 1986, he was named the Bob Jones Award winner, given in recognition of distinguished sportsmanship in golf.

Death and legacy
Sweetser died on May 27, 1989 in Bethesda, Maryland. Sweetser served as treasurer and on the executive committee of the United States Golf Association.  In 1986, he was named the Bob Jones Award winner, given in recognition of distinguished sportsmanship in golf.

Tournament wins
this list may be incomplete
1920 NCAA Championship
1922 U.S. Amateur, Metropolitan Amateur
1923 Gold Mashie Tournament
1925 Metropolitan Amateur, Gold Golf Ball Tourney (with Glenna Collett), Gibson Island C.C. Invitational
1926 British Amateur
1927 Gold Mashie Tournament
1931 Cape Cod Open

Amateur major championships

Wins (2)

Results timeline

Sweeter played in the Masters each year from 1952 to 1955 but withdrew on each occasion.

NYF = Tournament not yet founded
NT = No tournament
DNQ = Did not qualify for match play portion
R128, R64, R32, R16, QF, SF = Round in which player lost in match play

Source for The Masters:  www.masters.com

Source for U.S. Open and U.S. Amateur: USGA Championship Database

Source for 1923 British Amateur:  The American Golfer, July, 1923, pg. 10.

Source for 1926 British Amateur:  The American Golfer, July, 1926, pg. 9.

U.S. national team appearances
Amateur
Walker Cup: 1922 (winners), 1923 (winners), 1924 (winners), 1926 (winners), 1928 (winners), 1932 (winners), 1967 (winners, non-playing captain), 1973 (winners, non-playing captain)

References

External links
Yale University profile
U.S. Amateur 1922 page 
New York Times obituary
1926 Time Magazine article on the British Amateur

American male golfers
Amateur golfers
Yale Bulldogs men's golfers
Golf administrators
Golfers from St. Louis
Stockbrokers
Phillips Exeter Academy alumni
Martin Marietta people
1902 births
1989 deaths